The Estádio Nilton Santos is a stadium in Palmas, Tocantins, Brazil that is home to Palmas Futebol e Regatas, Capital Futebol Clube, Associação Desportiva e Recreativa São José, Tocantins Futebol Clube, and Tubarão Esporte Clube.

References

Football venues in Tocantins
Palmas, Tocantins